Paul William Malvern (June 28, 1902 – May 29, 1993) was an American film producer, child actor, and stuntman. He produced more than 100 films.

He began his career as a child acrobat. He later worked as a stuntman before transitioning to an assistant director role.

Some of his productions were westerns released by Monogram Pictures under Malvern's Lonestar Productions moniker. He produced many early Western films with John Wayne in them.

He married actress Jean Huntley.

As a child, he was an acrobatic performer, Malvern worked as a stuntman and later a film producer, producing several John Wayne features, and later numerous films for Universal Pictures.

Biography
Malvern was born June 28, 1902 in Portland, Oregon. He began his career as a member of his family's acrobatic troupe, and performed in vaudeville beginning at age four, when he was touted as "the greatest child acrobat on the American stage." His family's troupe toured internationally, performing as a featured act with the Ringling Brothers circus.

In Los Angeles, Malvern began first working in film as a double for Mary Pickford, as well as performing stunts. Malvern's first major stunt appearance was doubling for Eileen Sedgwick in Beasts of Paradise (1923). In 1928, Malvern suffered serious injuries in a -fall, and he retired from stunt performing, subsequently working as a producer for Universal Pictures and Monogram. Malvern married his wife, Jean Huntley, in 1932, to whom he was married until her death in 1979.

Death
Malvern died May 29, 1993 at his home in North Hollywood, Los Angeles. He is interred at the Hollywood Forever Cemetery.

Select filmography

Riders of Destiny (1933) 
 The Fugitive (1933)
Sagebrush Trail (1933) 
West of the Divide (1933) 
The Lucky Texan (1934) 
Randy Rides Alone (1934) 
The Star Packer (1934) 
The Trail Beyond (1934) 
'Neath the Arizona Skies (1934)
The Lawless Frontier (1934)
The Dawn Rider (1935) 
Paradise Canyon (1935) 
The Man From Utah (1934)
Blue Steel (1934)
Texas Terror (1935)
Rainbow Valley (1935)
The Desert Trail (1935)
Westward Ho (1935)
 Wolf Call (1939)
North to the Klondike (1942)
House of Frankenstein (1944)
Ali Baba and the 40 Thieves (1944)

See also
Robert North Bradbury

References

Sources

External links

1902 births
1993 deaths
American acrobatic gymnasts
American male film actors
American male silent film actors
20th-century American male actors
American stunt performers
Burials at Hollywood Forever Cemetery
Film producers from Oregon
Filmmakers from Portland, Oregon
Male actors from Portland, Oregon
Vaudeville performers